Persatuan Sepak Bola Indonesia Kota Tangerang, or Persikota Tangerang, is an Indonesian football club based in Tangerang, founded in 1994. The team plays in the third division of Indonesian football, Liga 3. Their home stadium is Benteng Stadium.

History
Persikota Tangerang was established on 11 October 1994 through the PSSI congress which was held at the end of December 1995, Persikota Tangerang was legalized as a member of PSSI and allowed to participate in the Liga Indonesia competition in the 1995-1996 season. After founding of the club, Persikota Tangerang won the Liga Indonesia Second Division in the 1995-1996 season after won 2–0 over Persipal Palu and won 1–0 against Persewangi Banyuwangi, Entering Liga Indonesia First Division in the 1996-1997 season, in order to prepare an adequate team in Division I, Persikota, which previously had recruited a number of national players from Pelita Jaya and Persija Jakarta, has now recruited several national and foreign players, Francis Yonga from Cameroon and Ali Shaha from Tanzania.

As a result, Persikota won the group and qualified for the Big 10 round. In the top 10, Persikota joined in group A and had to meet PSIM Yogyakarta, PSS Sleman, PSSB Bireuen, and Persiter Ternate which took place at the Mandala Krida Stadium, Yogyakarta. After recording pretty good results, winning two 5-2 wins against PSSB Bireuen, 3-0 against PSS Sleman, a 0–0 draw against PSIM Yogyakarta and a 4-3 defeat against Persiter Ternate, Persikota represented group A with Persiter to advance to the semifinal. and in the semifinals, Persikota faced the winner of group B, Perseden Denpasar, then Persikota managed to win through Nova Zaenal's goal in the 69th minute and the final result, they won through to the final round, Persikota had to again face PSIM who beat Persikabo Bogor 2-1 in the semifinals, which took place at the Mandala Krida stadium, Yogyakarta, the final result of Persikota was able to beat PSIM with a score of 3-1. And they qualified for the Liga Indonesia Premier Division in 1997-1998 season, earning the nickname Bayi Ajaib (In English: The Magical Baby). The highest achievement ever achieved by Persikota Tangerang was reaching the semifinals of the 1999-2000 Liga Indonesia Premier Division. This team is supported by a supporter groups called Benteng Mania.

Throughout the Liga Indonesia period in the 2000s, Persikota Tangerang was never relegated to the Division below it until 2013 due to the club's financial difficulties. In 2016, with the management and management of the new club, Persikota Tangerang is determined to rise from the second division, Liga 3. Persikota is currently competing in Liga 3 Banten zone from 2017-2021. In June 2021, the club was bought by Indonesian presenter and actor Gading Marten. On 2 November 2021, Persikota Tangerang made league match debut in 2021–22 season in a 5–1 win against Bantara SC at the Krakatau Steel Stadium, the achievement of 3 points at the same time led the club to top the provisional standings of Group B 2021 Liga 3 Banten zone. On 1 December 2021, 2021 Liga 3 Banten zone has been held and Persikota has become the champion to represent the province at the national level. On 30 January 2022, the club was bought by Indonesian actress, host, and singer Prilly Latuconsina. previously, the club was bought by Gading Marten but canceled.

Supporters
Persikota Tangerang has a large fanbase called Benteng Mania. Benteng Mania was founded in 1994 and its headquarters is at the Benteng Stadium, home to Persikota Tangerang. Benteng Mania now has 10,000 members in Tangerang.

Benteng Mania has its branches all around Indonesia. Among them are: Transit, Ciledug, V-room, Hard Kids, Sepatan, Benteng Makassar, Cipondoh, Benda, Kota, Kota Bumi, C-mone, Karawaci, Benua Indah complex (ROBIN), BInong, and Tanah Tinggi.

Benteng Mania also sang its own official songs during matches.

Club rivalries
Unlike the Old Indonesia derby between Persija Jakarta and Persib Bandung, the Tangerang Derby can actually be said to be young. The beginning of the rivalry between the two Tangerang clubs was due to the expansion of the Tangerang area (which at that time was still a district). When it was still called Tangerang Regency, the only football club that existed was Persita Tangerang which had been established since 1953.

Matches between these two clubs often present a high level of rivalry, not only from the club side but also from its supporters, a number of riots between supporters often break out when these two teams compete. This led the Tangerang Indonesian Ulema Council (MUI) to issue a fatwa forbidden to hold a football match in this area in 2012. This is of course the implication of a number of victims who have fallen due to the riots of supporters throughout the history of the Tangerang Derby.

Honours
Liga Indonesia Second Division
Champions: 1995–96
Liga Indonesia First Division
Champions: 1996–97
Liga 3 Banten
Champions: 2018,2019, 2021

Notable former players

This is the list of several domestic and foreign former notable or famous players of Persikota Tangerang from time to time.

Indonesia
  Jendri Pitoy
  Maulana Hasanuddin
  Yeyen Tumena
  Aliyudin Ali
  Jalwandi
  Andrian Mardiansyah
  Firmansyah
  Denny Agus
  Zainal Anwar
  Indra Kahfi Ardhiyasa
  Ishak Djober
  Muhammad Ilham
  Yudi Khoerudin
  Ritham Madubun
  Yandi Munawar
  Kahar Kalu Muzakkar
  Mohammad Nasuha
  Imran Nahumarury
  Listianto Raharjo
  Supriyono Salimin
  Ruben Sanadi
  Harry Saputra
  Leo Saputra
  Rendy Siregar
  Amin Syarifudin
  Ledi Utomo
  Francis Wewengkang

Africa (CAF)
  Ali Shaha
  Francis Yonga
  Moustapha Moctar Belbi
  Christian Lenglolo
  Epalla Jordan
  Salomon Bengondo
  Saphou Lassy
  Samuel Chebli

South America (CONMEBOL)
  Esteban Guillén
  Bruno Zandonaide

References

External links
 Persikota Tangerang at Soccerway
 Persikota Tangerang at Instagram

 
Football clubs in Indonesia
Football clubs in Banten
Association football clubs established in 1994
1994 establishments in Indonesia